Novo Selo is a village in the municipality of Kupres, Republika Srpska, Bosnia and Herzegovina and partially in the Federation of Bosnia and Herzegovina.

Demographics 
According to the 2013 census, its population was 123 in the RS part, all Serbs and zero in the FBIH part.

References

Populated places in Kupres, Republika Srpska
Populated places in Kupres